The Thief River Falls Norskies are an American Junior A ice hockey team from Thief River Falls, Minnesota. The team plays in the Superior International Junior Hockey League, which is a member of the Canadian Junior Hockey League.

History
The Norskies were founded in 2016 by a group of local investors that included former National Hockey League player Tim Bergland. The team name was chosen following a contest in local elementary schools and confirmed by the ownership group as it reflects the Norwegian heritage of northwestern Minnesota.

The team began play in the 2016–17 season with home games at Ralph Engelstad Arena.

Season-by-season results

References

External links
Team website

Superior International Junior Hockey League teams
Ice hockey teams in Minnesota
Ice hockey clubs established in 2016
2016 establishments in Minnesota
Sports in Thief River Falls, Minnesota